is a compilation album by Japanese duo Pink Lady, released on February 22, 2006 to commemorate the duo's 30th anniversary. The two-disc album features 12 of the duo's classic songs and their karaoke versions, as well as a medley of the tracks.

Track listing 
All tracks composed by Shunichi Tokura, lyrics written by Yū Aku.

Disc 1
 
 "S.O.S."
 
 
 
 "UFO"
 
 
 
 
 
 
 
 "Wanted (Shimei Tehai)"
 "Pepper Keibu"
 "Monster"
 "Nagisa no Sindbad"
 "Chameleon Army"
 "S.O.S."
 "UFO'
 "Southpaw"
 "Zipangu"
 "Super Monkey Son Goku"
 "Tōmei Ningen"
 "Carmen '77"

Disc 2 - Original Karaoke
 "Pepper Keibu"
 "S.O.S."
 "Carmen '77"
 "Nagisa no Sindbad"
 "Wanted (Shimei Tehai)"
 "UFO"
 "Southpaw"
 "Monster"
 "Tōmei Ningen"
 "Super Monkey Son Goku"
 "Chameleon Army"
 "Zipangu"

References

External links

2006 compilation albums
Pink Lady (band) compilation albums
Victor Entertainment compilation albums